Ian Hamer is the name of:

 Ian Hamer (musician) (1932–2006), British jazz trumpeter
 Ian Hamer (athlete) (born 1965), British long-distance runner

See also
Hamer (surname)